Raymond Charles Smith (12 August 1929 – 4 June 2010) was an Australian racewalker. He competed in the men's 50 kilometres walk at the 1956 Summer Olympics.

References

1929 births
2010 deaths
Athletes (track and field) at the 1956 Summer Olympics
Australian male racewalkers
Olympic athletes of Australia
Place of birth missing